George Hayduke is the pen name of a prolific anonymous author of prank books. The name is believed to be based on the character George Washington Hayduke III, created by Edward Abbey in his 1975 book The Monkey Wrench Gang, and 1990 book Hayduke Lives!. Often in collaboration with  perhaps equally pseudonymous co-author M. Nelson Chunder, Hayduke has authored numerous guides to pranks and practical jokes, primarily intended for vengeance. Activities suggested range from the merely annoying and mischievous to the illegal and extremely dangerous. Hayduke's book Getting Even: The Complete Book of Dirty Tricks was found in the locker of a man accused of the USS Iowa turret explosion, which killed 47 people.

Works

References

American humorists